Heleanna is a genus of moths belonging to the subfamily Olethreutinae of the family Tortricidae.

Species
Heleanna chloreis (Turner, 1916)
Heleanna fukugi Nasu, 1999
Heleanna melanomochla (Meyrick, 1936)
Heleanna physalodes (Meyrick, 1910)

See also
List of Tortricidae genera

References

External links
tortricidae.com

Eucosmini
Tortricidae genera